Michael Haydn's Symphony No. 21 in D major, Perger 42, Sherman 21, MH 272, written in 1778, is believed to have been written in Salzburg.

Scored for 2 oboes, 2 bassoons, 2 horns and strings, in three movements:

Adagio - Allegro molto
Andante, in A major
Presto

This symphony is the first of four by Michael Haydn to include a slow introduction before the first movement (the others are Symphonies Nos. 22, 27, and 30).  All four were written between 1778 and 1785 and attached to symphonies cast in three movements (without minuets).

Discography

On the CPO label, this symphony is available on a CD that also includes Symphonies Nos. 30, 31 and 32; Johannes Goritzki conducting the Deutsche Kammerakademie Neuss.

References
 A. Delarte, "A Quick Overview Of The Instrumental Music Of Michael Haydn" Bob's Poetry Magazine November 2006: 35 PDF
 Charles H. Sherman and T. Donley Thomas, Johann Michael Haydn (1737 - 1806), a chronological thematic catalogue of his works. Stuyvesant, New York: Pendragon Press (1993)
 C. Sherman, "Johann Michael Haydn" in The Symphony: Salzburg, Part 2 London: Garland Publishing (1982): lxviii

Symphony 21
1778 compositions
Compositions in D major